Autoluminescent, directed by Lynn-Maree Milburn and Richard Lowenstein, is a 2011 documentary film about musician Rowland S. Howard.

Festivals and awards 
Autoluminescent won an ATOM Award in 2012 in the Best Documentary Biography section. The world premiere of Autoluminescent was at the Melbourne International Film Festival in August 2011. Autoluminescent premiered internationally at the Santa Barbara International Film Festival in 2012.

References

External links
 
 
 Melbourne Review - Film Review
 Cinema Autopsy - Film Review

Documentary films about punk music and musicians
2011 films
2011 documentary films
Australian documentary films
Australian music
Post-punk
2010s English-language films
Films directed by Richard Lowenstein
Films directed by Lynn-Maree Milburn
English-language documentary films